Pyrausta coracinalis is a species of moth in the family Crambidae. It is found in Spain, France, Germany, Austria, Switzerland, Italy, the Czech Republic and most of the Balkan Peninsula (except Greece).

The larvae have been recorded feeding on the flowering plant Salvia pratensis.

References

Moths described in 1982
coracinalis
Moths of Europe